Let There Be Light may refer to:

Literature
"Let there be light", a phrase from English translations of a line of the Bible
Genesis 1:3, the line from the Bible saying "let there be light"
Let There Be Light, novel by Paruyr Sevak 1969
Let There Be Light (Howard Smith book), a book by Howard Alan Smith
"Let There Be Light" (Heinlein short story), a 1940 short story by Robert A. Heinlein
"Let There Be Light" (Clarke short story), a 1957 short story by Arthur C. Clarke

Film and television
 Let There Be Light (1917 film), a German silent drama film
 Let There Be Light (1946 film), directed by John Huston
 Let There Be Light (1998 film), directed by Arthur Joffé
 Let There Be Light (2007 film), a 2007 Israeli documentary film
 Let There Be Light (2017 film), religious drama film directed by and starring Kevin Sorbo
 Let There Be Light (2019 film), a Slovak-language film, directed by Marko Škop
"Let There Be Light" (SATC episode), an episode of Sex and the City
 "Let There Be Light" (Hercules: The Legendary Journeys), a Season 5 episode of the TV series
"Let There Be Light", an episode of Rugrats

Music
 "Let There Be Light", Symphony for organ No. 2 by Frederik Magle
 Let There Be Light (album), a 2016 album by Hillsong Worship
 "Let There Be Light" (album), a 2021 album by Sun Atoms

Songs
 "Let There Be Light" (song), a 1995 song by Mike Oldfield from The Songs of Distant Earth
 "Let There Be Light", a song by Belladonna 
 "Let There Be Light", a song by 21st Century Schizoid Band from Live in Italy
 "Let There Be Light", an instrumental by Justice from Cross
 "Let There Be Light", a song by The Qemists

Visual art
 "Let There Be Light", a stained glass installation by Abraham Rattner at Loop Synagogue in Chicago

See also
 "Let There Be More Light", a 1968 song by Pink Floyd